Diego Schwartzman was the defending champion but chose not to compete.

Robin Haase took the title, beating Paul-Henri Mathieu 7–6 (7–1), 6–2

Seeds

Draw

Finals

Top half

Bottom half

References
 Main Draw
 Qualifying Draw

Open du Pays d'Aix - Singles
2015 Singles